Albert IV of Austria (19 September 1377 – 14 September 1404) was a Duke of Austria.

Biography 
He was born in Vienna, the son of Albert III of Austria and Beatrix of Nuremberg.  He was the Duke of Austria from 1395 until 1404, which then included roughly today's Lower Austria and most of Upper Austria, as the other Habsburg dominions were at that time ruled by his relatives of the Leopoldinian Line of the family. Albert's rule was characterized by quarrels with that part of his family and with members of the Luxemburg dynasty, Wenceslaus and Sigismund.

Albert died at Klosterneuburg, Lower Austria, in 1404. He is buried in the Ducal Crypt in the Stephansdom in Vienna. He was succeeded by his son Albert. Through his maternal grandmother, Elisabeth of Meissen, Albert IV descended from Babenberg dukes of Austria.

Family and children
He was married in Vienna 24 April 1390 to Joanna Sophia of Bavaria, daughter of Albrecht I, Duke of Bavaria-Straubing and Margarete of Brieg. Their children were:
 Margarete (26 June 1395, Vienna–24 December 1447), married in Landshut 25 November 1412 to Duke Henry XVI of Bavaria.
 Albert V (16 August 1397–27 October 1439, Neszmély, Hungary).

References

Sources

External links 

Albert IV of Austria
Albert IV of Austria
14th-century dukes of Austria
15th-century dukes of Austria
Austrian people of German descent
Austrian people of Polish descent
Austrian people of French descent
Medieval Knights of the Holy Sepulchre
Burials at St. Stephen's Cathedral, Vienna